Rosslare Europort railway station serves Rosslare Harbour in County Wexford, Ireland. The station is owned and operated by Iarnród Éireann and is the southern terminus of the Dublin–Rosslare railway line.

Description
There is only one platform and a runaround loop. There is a turntable, used on occasion by preserved steam locomotives.

The station is staffed but has no ticket office. There is a ticket machine at the entrance to the platform. The single platform is accessible only via a ramp.

Passenger facilities consist of a waiting shelter with seat. There is also a small car park - chargeable.

The station is a eight-minute walk from the ferry terminal in the open air along a specially marked path.

Ferry connections

Overnight
The 03:45 ferry arrival from Fishguard has a train connection at 05:35 Monday-Friday (07:20 Saturdays; 09:40 Sundays), and the 18:15 sailing to Fishguard has a connecting train daily arriving at 16:33.

Daytime
The 16.30 ferry arrival has a daily onward train connection at 17:30 Monday-Friday (17:55 Saturdays; 18:05 Sundays). At present no train connects into the 07.30 sailing to Fishguard.

France
Several sailings to and from Cherbourg in France can also be conveniently accessed by the rail services to and from Rosslare Europort. The seasonal ferry route to Roscoff in France ceased in September 2018 but reopened by Brittany Ferries in 2020.

Connection to Waterford
It is now replaced by a revised Bus Éireann Route 370 service via Wellingtonbridge.
This bus service and the small number of other bus services from the port depart and arrive at the bus stops in front of the terminal building.

History
The old Rosslare Europort station opened on 30 August 1906 and closed on Monday 14 April 2008. The last service train to depart being the 07:40 to Dublin Connolly, worked by a six-car 2800 Class railcar set.

See also
 List of railway stations in Ireland

References

External links

Irish Rail Rosslare Europort rail station Website

Iarnród Éireann stations in County Wexford
Railway stations serving harbours and ports in Ireland
Railway stations in County Wexford
Railway stations opened in 1906
1906 establishments in Ireland
Railway stations in the Republic of Ireland opened in the 20th century